The Philippine House Committee on Population and Family Relations, or House Population and Family Relations Committee is a standing committee of the Philippine House of Representatives.

Jurisdiction 
As prescribed by House Rules, the committee's jurisdiction includes the following:
 Family relations
 Population census and statistics
 Population growth and family planning

Members, 18th Congress

See also
 House of Representatives of the Philippines
 List of Philippine House of Representatives committees

References

External links 
House of Representatives of the Philippines

Population and Family Relations